Mount Saint Joseph Academy is a Roman Catholic college preparatory high school located in Rutland, Vermont.  The school is under the jurisdiction of the Diocese of Burlington.

History
The Academy was started soon after the founding of the Sisters of St. Joseph Rutland community. After they arrived, the sisters began the task of building schools starting with St. Peter's School and, in 1882, the all-girls Mount St. Joseph Academy.

In 1927, the Sisters built a larger facility and opened as a co-educational academy. The academic curriculum remained the same. The advent of boys brought the introduction of a full athletics program. The music program grew to include a marching band and orchestra, with special diplomas offered in piano and violin. Drama was offered.

Student activities

MSJ offers a number of different extra-curricular clubs and societies. These groups include: Student Government, National Honor Society, National Art Honor Society, Yearbook Committee, Scholar's Bowl, and Soles of the Shoestring Theater.

Athletics
Sports include soccer, basketball, football, baseball, and cross country.

References

External links
Mount Saint Joseph Academy Official Website
Diocese of Burlington Official Website

Roman Catholic Diocese of Burlington
Catholic secondary schools in Vermont
Buildings and structures in Rutland, Vermont
Schools in Rutland County, Vermont
Educational institutions established in 1882
1882 establishments in Vermont